, also known as Takebe Kenkō, was a Japanese mathematician and cartographer during the Edo period.

Biography
Takebe was the favorite student of the Japanese mathematician Seki Takakazu Takebe is considered to have extended and disseminated Seki's work.

In 1706, Takebe was offered a position in the Tokugawa shogunate's department of ceremonies.

In 1719, Takebe's new map of Japan was completed; and the work was highly valued for its quality and detail.

Shōgun Yoshimune honored Takebe with rank and successively better positions in the shogunate.

Legacy
Takebe played critical role in the development of the Enri ("circle principle") - a crude analogon to the western calculus.   He also created charts for trigonometric functions.

This was the first power series expansion obtained in Wasan.  This result was first conjectured by heavy numeric computation.

He used Richardson extrapolation in 1695, about 200 years earlier than Richardson.

Takebe Prizes
In the context of its 50th anniversary celebrations, the Mathematical Society of Japan established the Takebe Prize and the Takebe Prizes for the encouragement of young people who show promise as mathematicians.

Selected works
In a statistical overview derived from writings by and about Takebe Kenko, OCLC/WorldCat encompasses roughly 10+ works in 10+ publications in 3 languages and 10+ library holdings.

 1683 –   OCLC 22056510086
 1685 –   OCLC 22056085721

See also
 Sangaku, the custom of presenting mathematical problems, carved in wood tablets, to the public in shinto shrines
 Soroban, a Japanese abacus
 Japanese mathematics
 Richardson extrapolation

Notes

References 
 Endō Toshisada (1896). . Tōkyō: _.  OCLC 122770600
 Horiuchi, Annick. (1994).   Les Mathematiques Japonaises a L'Epoque d'Edo (1600–1868): Une Etude des Travaux de Seki Takakazu (?-1708) et de Takebe Katahiro (1664–1739). 	Paris: Librairie Philosophique J. Vrin. ;   OCLC 318334322
 Selin, Helaine, ed. (1997).   Encyclopaedia of the History of Science, Technology, and Medicine in Non-Western Cultures. Dordrecht: Kluwer/Springer. ;   OCLC 186451909
 David Eugene Smith and Yoshio Mikami. (1914).   A History of Japanese Mathematics. Chicago: Open Court Publishing.   OCLC 1515528 -- note alternate online, full-text copy at archive.org
 

1664 births
1739 deaths
17th-century Japanese mathematicians
18th-century cartographers
18th-century Japanese mathematicians
Japanese writers of the Edo period